John Auld (21 January 1914 – 1996) was a British painter. His work was part of the painting event in the art competition at the 1948 Summer Olympics.

References

1914 births
1996 deaths
20th-century British painters
British male painters
Olympic competitors in art competitions
Artists from Belfast
20th-century British male artists